Salt Brook Academy is a Junior College, established in 1995, and located in Dibrugarh of Assam, India.

Salt Brook Academy is a co-educational institution with more than 1200 students, in a self-contained campus with all necessary infrastructural facilities. It is situated at Boiragimoth, in the heart of the city Dibrugarh. This institution is run by a society, named Salt Brook Academy Society registered under the Society Act of 1860.
Salt Brook Academy initially was a Junior College of Science stream but soon the academy covered all the three streams, Arts, Science and Commerce, recognized by the Assam Higher Secondary Education Council, vide letter AHSEC/RPR/DIB/C/313/9489, Dt. 11/01/2012.

Elective subjects offered in science stream include Physics, Chemistry, Mathematics, Biology, Computer Science & application ,and Statistics. While the core subjects in science stream include English and M.I.L ( Alternative English or Assamese or Hindi )

Campus 
Salt Brook Academy located at the heart of Boiragimoth, Dibrugarh.

References

External links 
 

Schools in Assam
Dibrugarh
1995 establishments in Assam
Educational institutions established in 1995